Young-ja, also spelled Yeong-ja, is a Korean feminine given name. According to South Korean government data, it was the most popular name for baby girls born in 1940. Its meaning depends on the hanja used to write it.

Hanja and meaning
There are 34 hanja with the reading "young" on the South Korean government's list of hanja which may be used in given names. The syllable "ja" is generally written using a hanja literally meaning "child". In Japan, where this character is read ko, it was originally used as suffix for the names of girls in the aristocracy. The practice of adding -ko to girls' names spread to the lower classes following the 1868 Meiji Restoration. Names containing this character, such as Soon-ja and Jeong-ja, became popular when Korea was under Japanese rule from 1910 to 1945, but declined in popularity afterwards. By 1950 there were no names ending in "ja" in the top ten. Some ways of writing the name Young-ja in hanja include:

, first hanja meaning "flower petals". The same characters are also used to write the Japanese feminine given names Eiko and Hideko, among others.
, first hanja meaning "flourishing". The same characters are also used to write the Japanese feminine given names Eiko and Saeko, among others.

People
People with this name include:
Young-ja Lee (born 1936), South Korean music educator and composer
Jung Hye-sun (born Jung Young-ja, 1942), South Korean actress
Kim Young-ja (born 1949), South Korean volleyball player 
Young-ja Cho (born 1951), South Korean sculptor
Lee Young-ja (handballer) (born 1964), South Korean team handball player and Olympic medalist 
Yang Young-ja (born 1964), South Korean table tennis player
Lee Young-ja (comedian) (born 1968), South Korean comedian
Park Yeong-ja (born 1975), South Korean rower
Chang Yeong-ja, South Korean financier, one of the principals in the 1982 Lee–Chang scandal

Fictional characters with this name include:
Yeong-ja, the titular character of the 1975 South Korean film Yeong-ja's Heydays

See also
List of Korean given names

References

Korean feminine given names